Castletown Metropolitan F.C. are a football club from Castletown on the Isle of Man. They compete in the Isle of Man Football League and wear a red and white kit. They play their home games at Malew Road in Castletown.

History
Formed in 1904, the club is one of the most successful on the Isle of Man. They have been champions of the Isle of Man League eight times, including three consecutive seasons from 1922–23 to 1924–25 and won the Manx FA Cup six times.

They have spent most of their history in the top flight as Castletown FC, last winning the league in 1999. Since then they have not been as successful, before in 2005–06 being relegated on just five points winning just one game all season with two draws and 21 defeats, scoring 19 goals in 24 games and conceding 99 goals. Town were promoted back to the top flight in 2009. After five years in the top flight, the "Town" were relegated again in 2014.

The club has a reserve team that plays in the Isle of Man Football Combination as well as a youth team, junior sides and a ladies team.

Castletown Football Stadium
The club play at Castletown Football Stadium on Malew Road in Castletown, which has a small covered terrace stand. The record attendance is over 2,500 for the first game played at the ground, against Liverpool Collegiate, in 1950. There is a club bar located in the main stand.

Honours

First team

League
Division One champions (8): 1913–14, 1922–23, 1923–24, 1924–25, 1949–50, 1950–51, 1981–82, 1998–99
Second League champions (1): 1913–14

Cup
FA Cup (6): 1913–14, 1922–23, 1949–50, 1961–62, 1984–85, 1992–93
Hospital Cup (3): 1923–24, 1968–69, 1978–79
Railway Cup (7): 1911–12, 1920–21, 1923–24, 1949–50, 1959–60, 1976–77, 1984–85
Woods Cup (1): 1960–61
Cap Final (2): 1922–23, 1923–24
Paul Henry Gold Cup (2): 2008–09, 2017–18

Reserve team

League
Combination League One champions (5): 1957–58, 1970–71, 1972–73, 1990–91, 1998–99

Cup
Junior Cup (4): 1951–52, 1953–54, 1970–71, 1978–79
Cowell Cup (U18) (6): 1948–49(shared), 1975–76, 1987–88, 1996–97, 2008–09, 2009–10

Other teams
14/16 League champions (1): 1985–86
14/16 B League champions (2): 1998–99, 1999–00
15/17 B League champions (1): 2008–09
15/17 Plate (1): 2005–06
15/17 B Cup (1): 2008–09
Women's Division Two champions (2): 2006–07, 2008–09

References

Football clubs in the Isle of Man
1904 establishments in the Isle of Man
Association football clubs established in 1904